US Post Office-Hamilton is a historic post office building located at Hamilton in Madison County, New York, United States. It was designed and built in 1936, and is one of a number of post offices in New York State designed by the Office of the Supervising Architect of the Treasury Department, Louis A. Simon.  It is a one-story, five bay steel frame building with a raised poured concrete foundation and brick watercourse in the Colonial Revival style.

The interior features a 1938 relief sculpture by Humbert Albrizio titled "The Messengers."

It was listed on the National Register of Historic Places in 1989.

References

External links

Hamilton
Government buildings completed in 1936
Colonial Revival architecture in New York (state)
National Register of Historic Places in Madison County, New York